The discography of Veronica Maggio, a Swedish singer, consists of seven studio albums and 28 singles.

In September 2006, Veronica released her debut studio album, Vatten och bröd, which peaked at number 14 on the Swedish Albums Chart, the album includes the singles "Dumpa mig", "Nöjd?" and "Havanna mamma". She released her second studio album Och vinnaren är... in March 2008, which peaked at number 7 on the Swedish Albums Chart and Norwegian Albums Chart, the album includes the singles "Måndagsbarn", "Stopp" and "17 år". In April 2011 she released her third studio album Satan i gatan, which peaked at number one on the Swedish Albums Chart, number two on the Norwegian Albums Chart, number 24 on the Danish Albums Chart and number 33 on the Finnish Albums Chart. The album includes the singles "Jag kommer" and "Välkommen in".

Studio albums

Extended plays

Singles

As lead artist

As featured artist

Other charted songs

Songwriting credits

Notes

References

External links
 

Discographies of Swedish artists
Pop music discographies